Bizzotto is an Italian surname. Notable people with the surname include:

Frank Bizzotto (born 1971), Australian rules footballer
Giulio Bizzotto (born 1996), Italian footballer
Mara Bizzotto (born 1972), Italian politician
Romolo Bizzotto (born 1925), Italian footballer

Italian-language surnames